This is a list of the various award ceremonies held in Ghana to reward people in the arts, fashion, entertainment, football, entrepreneurship and other sectors.

 Ghana UK-Based Achievement Awards
 Ghana Movie Awards
Vodafone Ghana Music Awards
Exclusive Men of the Year Africa Awards (EMY Award)
4Syte Music Video Awards
RTP Awards
Ghana DJ Awards
3RD TV Music Video Awards
Ghana Football Awards
Golden Movie Awards
3Music Awards
Glitz Style Awards
WatsUp TV Africa Music Video Awards
Ghana Music Awards USA
Western Music Awards - Ghana

See also
 Lists of awards

References 

Ghana